Bonvilston is a village in the Vale of Glamorgan, Wales. The village is situated on the A48 about four miles east of Cowbridge and near the Welsh capital city of Cardiff. The population in 2011 was 392.

History 

It is named after Simon de Bonville, a Norman nobleman; hence the name of the village, though different in English and Welsh, translates as "Simon's town" or "Bonville's town" and refers to the same person. Simon de Bonville lived here in the 12th century. In 1291, "Margam conveyed to Thomas le Spudur of Bonvilston an acre of arable land with a house and curtilage in the vill of 'Tudekistowe', which Thomas, son of Robert had previously leased from the abbey; in exchange, Thomas gave the abbey two acres of land in Bonvilston." The manor subsequently became increasingly under the power of Margam Abbey.

In the 19th century, Richard Bassett, a prominent figure in Glamorgan resided at Bonvilston House and owned the manor. The 1811 A Topographical Dictionary of The Dominion of Wales by Nicholas Carlisle said of the village:

Notable landmarks

The village has two pubs, The Red Lion, and The Aubrey Arms.  A Third pub, The Old Post, closed in 2019 and in 2021, permission was granted to convert this into a hotel.  There is a corner shop called the old village shop. St Mary's parish church, rebuilt in 1860 in the Victorian era style retains a late mediaeval Sanctus bell.

References

External links

Photos of Bonvilston and surrounding area at Geograph

Villages in the Vale of Glamorgan